Berytius ('Berytian') is a Latin surname given to several writers native of Berytus (modern-day Beirut):
 Hermippus Berytius (fl. 2nd century AD), grammarian
 Lupercus Berytius, grammarian
 M. Valerius Probus Berytius (c. 20/30 – 105 AD), grammarian
 Taurus Berytius, Platonic philosopher
 Vindonius Anatolius Berytius, Greek author of the 4th century AD

References

 

Latin-language surnames